aka Tora-san Homebound is a 1970 Japanese comedy film directed by Yoji Yamada. It stars Kiyoshi Atsumi as Torajirō Kuruma (Tora-san), and Aiko Nagayama as his love interest or "Madonna". Tora-san's Runaway is the fifth entry in the popular, long-running Otoko wa Tsurai yo series.

Cast
 Kiyoshi Atsumi as Torajiro
 Chieko Baisho as Sakura
 Aiko Nagayama as Setsuko Miura
 Hisashi Igawa as Tsuyoshi Kimura
 Gin Maeda as Hiroshi Suwa
 Taisaku Akino as Noboru Kawamata
 Masamichi Matsuyama as Sumio Ishida
 Chieko Misaki as Tsune Kuruma (Torajiro's aunt)
 Hisao Dazai as Tarō Ume
 Tokuko Sugiyama as Setsuko's mother, Tomiko
 Gajirō Satō as Genkichi (Man at the Temple)
 Michio Kida as Masayoshi Takioka

Critical appraisal
Chieko Baisho was given the Best Actress award at both the Mainichi Film Awards and the Kinema Junpo Awards for her roles in Tora-san's Runaway and Kazoku. Yoji Yamada and Akira Miyazaki were also given the Best Screenplay award at those two ceremonies for their work on those two films.

The German-language site molodezhnaja gives Tora-san's Runaway three out of five stars.

Availability
Tora-san's Runaway was released theatrically on August 26, 1970. In Japan, the film was released on videotape in 1983 and 1995, and in DVD format in 2005 and 2008.

References

Bibliography

English

German

Japanese

External links
 Tora-san's Runaway at www.tora-san.jp (official site)

1970 films
Films directed by Yoji Yamada
1970 comedy films
1970s Japanese-language films
Otoko wa Tsurai yo films
Japanese sequel films
Shochiku films
Films with screenplays by Yôji Yamada
Films set in Chiba Prefecture
Films set in Otaru
Films set in Sapporo
1970s Japanese films